The Shire of Mullewa was a local government area in the Mid West region of Western Australia, about  east of the city of Geraldton and about  north of the state capital, Perth. It amalgamated with the City of Geraldton-Greenough on 1 July 2011 to become part of the City of Greater Geraldton.

History
The Mullewa Road District was constituted on 11 August 1911, and on 1 July 1961, it became a shire under the Local Government Act 1960.

Amalgamation
Throughout 2010 and 2011, negotiations were held between the City of Geraldton-Greenough and the Shire of Mullewa as to whether the two entities should merge. After a long period of negotiations, the entities decided to merge. The merger was approved by the Local Government Advisory Board in December 2010. A poll was requested by both communities and was held on 16 April 2011. 83.24% of voters voted against the merger in Mullewa, with 72.39% of voters against the merger in Geraldton-Greenough. However, both polls failed to reach the minimum 50% turnout required to be a valid poll. The two entities merged on 1 July 2011 to become the City of Greater Geraldton.

Wards
The Shire was divided into four wards:

 Central Ward (three councillors)
 East Ward (two councillors)
 South Ward (two councillors)
 West Ward (one councillor)

Towns and localities
 Mullewa
 Pindar
 Tardun
 Tenindewa
 Wandanooka
 Wilroy
 Wongoondy
 Woolgorong

Population

References

Mullewa
2011 disestablishments in Australia
Mid West (Western Australia)